Ektopodon is an extinct genus of marsupial,  and is the type genus of the family Ektopodontidae which occurred in forested environments in South Australia, Queensland and Victoria. The last species of this group went extinct in the early Pleistocene (between 2.588 million years ago and 781,000 years ago). Its body mass was estimated around 1300 grams. Scientists believe that ektopodontids were highly specialised seed-eating possums.

The type species Ektopodon serratus describes material excavated at the Lake Ngapakaldi fossil site in South Australia.

References

Prehistoric marsupial genera
Prehistoric diprotodonts
Riversleigh fauna
Fossil taxa described in 1967